The IAAF Continental Cup  was an international track and field competition organized by the International Association of Athletics Federations (IAAF).

The event was proposed by IAAF former President Primo Nebiolo and was first held in 1977 as the IAAF World Cup. The event was initially held every two years, but following the establishment of the World Athletics Championships it moved to a quadrennial basis. The 1989 edition was held the same year as the World Indoor Championships, then moved to the even-year between Summer Olympics, ensuring the sport of athletics had a global competition in all years.

The original format included separate men's and women's competitions consisting of 21 events each, with team points being awarded for the finishing position of each athlete. Eight teams, five continental and three national, entered an athlete in each event: if the stadium had a ninth lane, the host nation would also be permitted to enter. 

The eight entrants included the United States, the top two nations in the preceding European Cup and continental teams comprising Africa, Asia, Oceania, the rest of the Americas (North American, Central American and Caribbean Athletic Association and Confederación Sudamericana de Atletismo), and the rest of Europe.

From 2010, the event was rebranded to the IAAF Continental Cup, with the national teams being removed, and team scoring incorporated both the sexes. Two athletes per individual event were entered by four regional teams: Africa, Asia/Pacific, Europe and the Americas), though the regions had only one team each for the relay events.

After a decision at the 206th IAAF Council Meeting, held after the 2016 Summer Olympics, long-distance events were removed from the programme, and the 4 × 400 metres relay event was modified to a mixed-gender event. 

A nation-based competition, the Athletics World Cup, was staged in 2018 by an independent promoter. The IAAF competition was briefly rebranded as the World Athletics Continental Cup in 2019, but the event was scrapped in March 2020.

Results

IAAF World Cup

IAAF Continental Cup

Cup records 
Key to tables:

Men

Women

Trophy 

A silver trophy was presented to winners of the men's competition. The women's equivalent was later remodelled and used for the Continental Cup. The winners' names were engraved around the bottom and the winners would keep a hold of the trophy until the next edition.

As the IAAF World Cup, World Cup trophies were presented to the athletes of the winning team. It was the sole prize awarded by the IAAF for the team category.

As the IAAF Continental Cup, in 2018, a new trophy was unveiled for the winners of the combined team event (men and women). 
All individual athletes of the winning team were presented with awards for the first time.

References

External links 
World Athletics Continental Cup
 IAAF World Cup and Continental Cup Statistic Handbook
 Mark Butler's top ten moments: Men, Women

 
International athletics competitions
Defunct athletics competitions
Team combination track and field competitions
Continental Cup
Recurring sporting events established in 1977
Recurring sporting events disestablished in 2020
Quadrennial sporting events
World cups